Pockley is a small village and civil parish in the Ryedale district of North Yorkshire, England. It is about 1 mile north-east of Helmsley turning north from the A170 road. Its short, winding lane passes six thatched cottages in a quarter mile before turning back toward the A170 and its junction at Beadlam and Nawton.

The Grade II-listed church of St John the Baptist was built in 1870 and designed by Sir Gilbert Scott or his son.  The chancel screen and other furnishings were provided by Temple Moore in 1898-99 and rood beam figures by Lang of Oberammergau.  The church's very unusual heating system was based on the Roman Hypocaust.  Warm air came through underfloor ducts from a coke-fired stove beneath the church.  Originally the fuel for the stove was carried through a 25-foot brick-lined tunnel on a miniature railway which is still in existence but rarely used. The hot air heating system was restored in 2012 and for the first time in over 60 years the Church is now warm for services.

References

External links

 http://www.docbrown.info/docspics/helmsley/hspage12.htm, accessed 22 May 2013.
 https://pockley.org/ accessed 13 February 2021. Pockley family in Australia

Villages in North Yorkshire
Civil parishes in North Yorkshire